Glatten is a municipality in the district of Freudenstadt in Baden-Württemberg in Germany.

Geography

Geographical location
The state-approved health resort Glatten is located about ten kilometers southeast of the county town of Freudenstadt, nestled between meadows and forests in the northern Black Forest. The place is traversed by the eponymous river Glatt. The Old High German waters Name "glat" or "glad" means, among other things "clear, glossy, pure."

Municipality arrangement
The municipality Glatten includes the formerly independent municipalities Böffingen and Neuneck. For former municipality Böffingen include the village and the houses Böffingen, Bellenstein and Electrical works. The municipality Glatten in the borders of December 31, 1973 includes the village Glatten, the farm and the house Lattenberg Hammerschmiede. For former municipality Neuneck include the village Neuneck, the hamlet Rinkwasen and courtyards Schellenberg and Ziegelacker.
In territory of the former municipality Neuneck lies the deserted village Gaisnang, from the Gaisweilerhof remained until he went off in 1632.
The two former municipalities Böffingen and Neuneck are furnished as villages within the meaning of Baden-Württemberg municipal code with ensuite council and mayor as chairman.

Neighboring communities
The municipality borders on Dornstetten, on the east by Schopfloch and the city Horb, in the south on Dornhan district Rottweil, in the southwest of Lossburg and in the west on Freudenstadt.

History
Glatten was first mentioned in 767. The historical place named "Glatheim" and "villa Gladeheim" mean "Home of the Straight" (glad, glat = shiny, bright, pure) and are indications of origin in the Merovingian period. In 1308 the Count of Hohenberg acquired as a pledge by Anna von Fürstenberg and her husband John of Geroldseck with Dornstetten also Glatten. Since 1320, the place is one of Württemberg.

Religions
Since the Reformation Glatten is Protestant coined. The Lutheran church with the bell tower from the 12th century is stationary picture formative. To date, there are no Roman Catholic church in the village. The New Apostolic Church is represented in Glatten.

Economy and Infrastructure

Transportation
Glatten has a connection to the B 28 Ulm - Reutlingen - Tübingen - Strasbourg on the K 4760, and a connection to the B 294 Pforzheim - Freiburg - Basel on L 406.

Established businesses

In Glatten is the head office of the company J. Schmalz GmbH, a supplier of vacuum handling devices. Also in Glatten is a production site of the company L'Orange GmbH.

Buildings
In Glatten is a wind power plant, on it is installed a 100.1 MHz with 1 kW transmitter for free radio Freudenstadt. 
Since the 1920s, is located in Glatten  Glatt and Lauter dams for water to escape through the tunnels buildings of the Heimbach Reservoir (Loßburg-) Sterneck and from there to the hydroelectric power plant in (Dornhan-) Bettenhausen. Of relevance to the site is also the completed in 2010, upriver built on the Glatt flood retention structure founded ten years after the Glatt high tides on February 15, 1990 By the Zweckverbandes  Glatt-valley.

Notable people

 Jürgen Klopp (16 June 1967), former football player, now football manager (Mainz, Dortmund, Liverpool)  spent his childhood and youth in Glatten.

References

Freudenstadt (district)
Württemberg